District of Prizren (Kosovo/UNMIK)
Prizren District (Serbia)

District name disambiguation pages